Honestbee (stylised as honestbee) was an online grocery and food delivery service as its core business, a concierge service, and also a parcel delivery service for its B2B clients. The company provided personal shoppers that pick products for its clients. Consumers utilized the company's mobile app or website to interface with the company, and the store pickers and retail stores also utilized the mobile app. In Singapore, honestbee also provided laundry collection services.

History
The company was launched in Singapore on 23 July 2015  and after that time also launched in Hong Kong, Taiwan, Thailand, Indonesia, Malaysia, Bangkok, Philippines and Japan. The company was founded by Joel Sng, Isaac Tay, and Jonathan Low and had backing from venture capital companies in Asia and the United States.

In 2018, honestbee launched an online and offline grocery store in Singapore called Habitat, which aimed for "more human engagement" for shoppers. Since 10 Feb 2020, the company closed Habitat due to reduced footfall on account of the COVID-19 pandemic. As of 9 Mar 2020, Habitat remained closed and the company considered a permanent closure of Habitat due to heavy overhead costs.

Starting mid-April 2019, the company started facing speculation of lacking operational funds and have since stopped their service in the Philippine market. In May 2019, it stopped the food delivery and laundry services in Singapore.

In 2018 to 2019, co-founders Isaac Tay and Jonathan Low resigned from the company. 

Mr Sng was replaced as CEO by Mr Brian Koo, who had said that he would be working with the executive team to conduct an in-depth review of the business and to "align our strategic interests across our various geographies and verticals".

In April 2020, Honestbee creditor Benjamin Lim applied to wind up the company. The company was subsequently issued a winding up order in July 2020 and dissolved shortly after; the site formerly occupied by habitat, described as their "crowning jewel", is currently leased out and used by RedMart.

Services

Grocery 
Partnering both supermarkets and specialty stores, customers were able to shop a range of grocery options. Brands such as FairPrice, Jones the Grocer, Tesco, and Emporium Shokuhin were available on their platform. The grocery business was available in all 8 countries in which honestbee operates.

Food 
honestbee launched their food delivery service in February 2017. First launched in Singapore, the service was then rolled out in Taiwan, Malaysia, Japan, Hong Kong, Philippines, and Thailand. As of May 2018, they'd become an exclusive partner of MOS Burger in Singapore.

Laundry 
Launched in September 2016, the honeybee laundry service was only available in Singapore. Customers were able to get their laundry picked up, cleaned, and delivered back in 2 days time. Their pickup and delivery time for laundry service was from 1pm to 10pm(GMT+8), every day.

Tickets 
Launched in late 2017, the Ticketing service was only available in Singapore. Customers were able to purchase tickets to WE Cinemas, direct from the app. It also served as an aggregator of movie timings across multiple cinema chains in Singapore.

Presence 
honestbee was operational in eight regions in Asia:

Singapore (ended July 2020)
Malaysia
Thailand
Indonesia (ended March 2019)
Japan
Philippines
Hong Kong (ended May 2019)
Taiwan

Controversy

April fool's prank 
In late March 2016, honestbee announced a partnership with "Explorer Joe Exotic Meats" (later revealed to be fictitious), which would allow customers to purchase meat from endangered animals including pandas and whales. While the company eventually claimed its intention all along had been to "bring awareness" and stimulate conversation about the plight of endangered species, the company faced backlash from the public both before and after the revelation that the campaign was a hoax, with a number of customers saying they would boycott the service.

Worker pay 
In 2015, honestbee stated it was paying Singapore workers "up to SGD $14 (about $10) an hour;" by May 2016, however, workers countered that the company had lowered the "basic rate" twice, from $7.50 to $6 and then $5, and that there were also issues with payroll being late or miscalculated.

Founder issues 
Honestbee CEO and co-founder Joel Sng was able to net millions of dollars in funding for the company. But rather than building the startup, he bought a house in Japan, rented apartments in various cities, and spent millions renovating physical offices—first revealed in 2019 by Tech in Asia. The company performance numbers that Sng gave to investors and employees were fraudulent; the company has since initiated legal action against Sng for breaching of fiduciary duties.

Sng was declared bankrupt in May 2022.

See also 
 List of online grocers

References

External links
 

Online retailers of Singapore
Online grocers
Retail companies established in 2015
Internet properties established in 2015
2015 establishments in Singapore
Singaporean brands
Laundry businesses